The Gibraltar men's national under-18 basketball team is a national basketball team of Gibraltar, administered by the Gibraltar Amateur Basketball Association. It represents the country in international men's under-18 basketball competitions.

The team won two silver medals at the FIBA U18 European Championship Division C.

FIBA U18 European Championship participations

See also
Gibraltar men's national basketball team
Gibraltar men's national under-16 basketball team
Gibraltar women's national under-18 basketball team

References

External links
Archived records of Gibraltar team participations

Basketball in Gibraltar
Basketball
Men's national under-18 basketball teams